Alexander Frederick, Landgrave of Hesse  (25 January 1863 – 26 March 1945) was a German prince of the House of Hesse.

Biography
He was the son of Prince Frederick William of Hesse-Kassel and Princess Anna of Prussia. From 1888 to 1925 he was Head of the electoral line of the House of Hesse, but abdicated his position to his brother Prince Frederick Charles of Hesse.  He was born with a visual impairment, and this disability, in addition to his morganatic marriage, played a part in his decision to abdicate.

On 25 March 1925, he married morganatically Baroness Gisela Stockhorner von Starheim (b. 17 January 1884, d. 22 June 1965), daughter of Otto, Baron Stockhorner von Starheim and Baroness Emilie Susanne Hildegard von Wolzogen-Neuhaus. She was Lady-in-waiting of Grand Duchess Hilda of Baden.

Honours
He received the following orders and decorations:

Ancestors

References 

|-

1863 births
1945 deaths
German princes
House of Hesse-Kassel
Blind royalty and nobility
German people with disabilities
Recipients of the Cross of Honour of the Order of the Dannebrog
Annulled Honorary Knights Grand Cross of the Royal Victorian Order